Alethea Blow Charlton (9 August 1931 – 6 May 1976) was a British actress.

Life
She was born in Middlesbrough, North Riding of Yorkshire, England, and attended Ripon High School and the Northern Theatre School which was based at the Bradford Playhouse. After working in repertory for a few years in Yorkshire, she moved to London in 1960 before touring American universities as a member of a group. Alethea's family history was traced by people investigating the Naylor family history. The report indicates that she was descended from a line of people with the surname Charlton, as well as Blow, Dickerson, Naylor and Heyes.

Acting career

Charlton was a cast member in episodes two, three and four of the first ever Doctor Who serial (An Unearthly Child) broadcast in late 1963, as a cavewoman called Hur. She returned playing the character Edith in the serial The Time Meddler in 1965.

Her other TV credits include: Z-Cars, Follyfoot, The Borderers, Doomwatch, Out of the Unknown, Upstairs, Downstairs and a three-year recurring role in the Granada Television drama Sam.

Death

She died of a malignant melanoma at the age of 44. Her last known acting role was in the soap opera The Cedar Tree, which was aired posthumously.

Filmography

Television

References

External links
 

1931 births
1976 deaths
English television actresses
20th-century British actresses
People from Middlesbrough
20th-century English women
20th-century English people
20th-century British businesspeople